Khallikote University was a state university situated in Brahmapur, Odisha. It was founded in 2015 as a cluster university with five constituent colleges, transformed into a unitary university in 2020 and merged with Berhampur University in 2021, thus ceasing operation.

History
Khallikote University was established in 2015 as the first cluster university in Odisha. This was achieved by excluding Five colleges from the jurisdiction of Berhampur University (BU) and granting them autonomy, also allowing them to share infrastructure and teaching faculty. The five colleges were Khallikote College, Sashi Bhusan Rath Government Women's College, Government Science, Chhatrapur College, Binayak Acharya College and Gopalpur College. In 2020, the university was changed to a unitary university, i.e., a university with no affiliated colleges, and the five colleges were re-affiliated to BU. In 2021, the university itself was merged with BU and it ceased operation.

References

External links
 

Universities in Odisha
Education in Berhampur
Educational institutions established in 1878
1878 establishments in India